Roger Alan Kerr (born 18 December 1960) is a former Australian rules football player and coach. He later coached WAFL side .

Early life
Kerr was born in Calcutta in 1960 to Coral Beryl and Denzil Mowbray Kerr. His Anglo-Indian parents were also born in Calcutta. His father was a metallurgist and represented Bengal as a featherweight boxer, while his mother played basketball. The family immigrated to Australia in 1969, settling in Fremantle, Western Australia.

Playing career
Kerr made his senior debut for East Fremantle during the 1981 WAFL season. He was a "quick, lively rover with good skills and keen goal sense", although he suffered from injuries and was occasionally inconsistent. Kerr had a breakout season in 1984, kicking 31 goals from 23 games and playing in the grand final loss to Swan Districts. He played only five games the following year, but this included the grand final victory against Subiaco, a game he started on the interchange bench.

In 1987, Kerr kicked 36 goals from 23 games and placed fourth in the Sandover Medal, only two votes behind the winner Mark Watson. He recorded the fifth-highest disposal count during the season. In 1988, Kerr moved to the SANFL to play for Port Adelaide, kicking 23 goals from 24 games and playing in the grand final victory over Glenelg, his second premiership. He again began the game on the interchange bench.

Kerr returned to the WAFL in 1989, playing four further games with East Fremantle to bring his total to 85 senior WAFL games with the club. He also played one game against Richmond in the 1985 AFC Night Series. He finished his career with Perth, kicking 19 goals from 16 games across 1990 and 1991.

Coaching career
He was sacked after round six of the 2009 season after Claremont lost their first five games.

Family
His daughter, Sam Kerr, has represented the Matildas (the Australian women's soccer team), was named MVP of the National Women's Soccer League in the USA in 2017 and was the Young Australian of the Year in 2018. His son, Daniel Kerr, played football for the West Coast Eagles in the Australian Football League (AFL).

References

External links
 WAFL stats

1960 births
Australian people of Anglo-Indian descent
Australian sportspeople of Indian descent
Australian people of English descent
Claremont Football Club coaches
East Fremantle Football Club players
Living people
Sportspeople from Kolkata
Anglo-Indian people
Sportsmen from Western Australia
Port Adelaide Football Club administrators
Port Adelaide Football Club (SANFL) players
Port Adelaide Football Club players (all competitions)
Australian rules footballers from Perth, Western Australia